The National Dairy Research Institute (NDRI), Karnal is India's premier institute for dairy research. The institute was accorded the status of Deemed University in the year 1989.

History
ICAR-National Dairy Research Institute (NDRI) at Karnal, Haryana is one of the premier institutes in the dairy sector, which has contributed a lot in the growth of the dairy industry and played a crucial role in India's development in milk production with its continuous research. Over ninety nine years old NDRI's lineage goes back to the Imperial Institute for Animal Husbandry & Dairying which was set up in Bangalore in 1923 as a center for dairy education. In its erstwhile form of Imperial Institute in Bangalore, Father of the Nation Mahatma Gandhi and ‘Bharat Ratna’ Pandit Madan Mohan Malviya, were imparted training at the institute in 1927. They wanted to get acquainted with modern methods of cattle management and spent two weeks discussing and learning technicalities and complexities of problems pertaining to cows and buffalos in India. Gandhiji was highly appreciative of the most productive crossbred cow ‘Jill’ of the institute. He held several discussions on the problems of Pinjrapoles, which housed low-producing, mostly sterile cows and other dairy stock mainly on humanitarian grounds. Mahatma Gandhi evinced great interest in the work of the institute and wrote several articles in `Young India’ and `Harijan’ on the importance of dairying and scientific cattle management. Gandhiji's thinking and views had a significant influence on the political leadership, particularly towards taking key policy decisions during the early post-Independence era, resulting in the formulation of the Key Village Scheme, Gosamvardhana Council, and intensive Cattle Development Programmes. In 1936 it was renamed as Imperial Dairy Institute and it was shifted to its present site in Karnal in 1955 and renamed again as National Dairy Research Institute. The infrastructure of Imperial Institute was retained as a southern regional station of NDRI and later in 1964 Eastern regional station was set up at Kalyani in West Bengal. In 1970, NDRI was brought under the Indian Council of Agricultural Research. The institute has the distinction of being a Deemed University for implementing its academic programs since 1989. The institute provides high-quality education in the field of dairying, which has no parallel in Asia. It is noteworthy that NDRI is not only an important contributor of manpower in dairying required in State Agricultural Universities (SAUs) but also plays an important role in enhancing the teaching capabilities of the faculty from SAUs.

See also
College of Dairy Technology, Etawah

References

Karnal
Agricultural research institutes in India
Dairy farming in India
Dairy organizations
Agricultural universities and colleges in Haryana